Frank Andrews may refer to:

 Frank Andrews (politician) (1854–1924), farmer, educator and political figure in Nova Scotia, Canada
 Frank Andrews (Texas lawyer) (1864–1936), assistant attorney general of Texas
 Frank Andrews (rugby) (1886–1944), Welsh rugby union and rugby league footballer
 Frank Andrews (singer) (born 1985), contestant from Season 2 of New Zealand Idol
 Frank Andrews (actor) (c. 1860–1935), Broadway and silent film actor in The Warrens of Virginia (1924 film) 
 Frank Maxwell Andrews (1884–1943), Lieutenant General, Air Corps, U.S. Army
 Frank Mills Andrews (1867–1948), American architect

See also
 Frank Andrews Shimkus (born 1952), often known as Frank Andrews, former journalist and Pennsylvania State Representative
Francis Andrews (disambiguation)